FDC may refer to:

Organizations

Companies
 Food Donation Connection, an American surplus food rescue company
 Football DataCo, a British football media company
 Forensic DNA Consultants, a South African forensics company
 Filinvest, a Philippine real estate conglomerate
 First Data, an American financial services company

Government and politics
 Congolese Democratic Front, a political party in the Republic of the Congo
 Democratic Front of Cabinda, a rebel group in Cabinda, Angola
 Democratic Front of the Comoros, a defunct Comoran political party
 Federal detention center, part of the US Bureau of Prisons
 Federal Food, Drug, and Cosmetic Act, of the US federal government
 Federation for a Democratic China, a political group in China
 Florida Department of Corrections, in the US
 Forum for Democratic Change, a political party in Uganda

Education
 Fazaia Degree College, Faisal, in Pakistan
 Forward Degree College, in Pakistan
 Fundação Dom Cabral, a Brazilian business school

Science and technology
 Floppy-disk controller, hardware that controls a computer floppy disk drive
 HP Flexible Data Center, a modular data center built from prefabricated components by Hewlett-Packard
 Flow duration curve, used to evaluate small hydro-electric plants

Medicine
 Ferulic acid decarboxylase (Fdc), decarboxylase enzymes
 Fixed dose combination, a medicine that includes two or more active ingredients combined in a single dosage form
 Follicular dendritic cells, of the immune system

Other uses
 FIFA Disciplinary Code, a set of codes and regulations promulgated by FIFA's judicial bodies
 Fire direction center, of a military field artillery team
 First day cover, a postage stamp franked on the first day of issue
 First Down Classic, a former American football bowl game
 Flight Data Coordinator, in Australia
 Fuera de Clase, a Venezuelan boy band
 Fire department connection, a standpipe in the Glossary of firefighting
 , Wikipedia body for the international distribution of funds in the Wikimedia movement